Marek Čech (born 8 April 1976) is a Czech former football goalkeeper.

Career
Čech started playing football at age 8 for Slavia Orlová, whose first team was then in 4th division. In 1990, he moved to Baník Ostrava, where he did not manage to get a place in the senior team, even though he did sign a contract when he turned 18. Two years later, he had to do his military service and spent this year playing for VTJ Hranice.

When he came back, he was loaned to second-division teams Frýdek-Místek, NH Ostrava and Fotbal Třinec. In Frýdek-Místek he only got to play three games, only in Ostrava did he become a regular. In early 2001, he was surprisingly sold to Slovak club MŠK Žilina but there he was only the number two. At the start of the 2003/04 season, he was briefly loaned to former club Třinec, then sold to Spartak Trnava. There he had no real concurrence and put up good performances, which drew the attention of Slovan Liberec that purchased him in 2004. He was first considered a substitute (behind Zbyněk Hauzr), but quickly became number one and even one of the best goalkeepers in the Czech league, spending 740 minutes without conceding a goal in 2006.

On 15 November 2006, he made his debut for the Czech national team in a friendly against Denmark that ended up in a 1–1 draw. This was, however, to remain his only cap as he was never able to be more than the number 3 goalkeeper, behind Petr Čech and Jaromír Blažek.

On 5 January 2007, he agreed on a contract that linked him for two years with Russian club Luch-Energia Vladivostok. The fee was undisclosed but is believed to have been around 12 million koruna ($600,000). In August 2008, he was sold to Lokomotiv Moscow.

In August 2014, Čech was signed by Delhi Dynamos in the newly formed Indian Super League.

Honours
MŠK Žilina
Corgoň Liga: 2001–02

Slovan Liberec
Gambrinus liga: 2005–06

References

External links

 fcslovanliberec.cz 

1976 births
Living people
Czech footballers
Czech expatriate footballers
Association football goalkeepers
Czech Republic international footballers
FC Slovan Liberec players
FC Spartak Trnava players
FC Viktoria Plzeň players
FC Luch Vladivostok players
Expatriate footballers in Slovakia
Czech expatriate sportspeople in Slovakia
FC Lokomotiv Moscow players
Expatriate footballers in Russia
Czech expatriate sportspeople in Russia
Czech First League players
Russian Premier League players
Slovak Super Liga players
FC Zhemchuzhina Sochi players
Indian Super League players
Odisha FC players
Expatriate footballers in India
Czech expatriate sportspeople in India
Sportspeople from Ostrava